Air Belgium may refer to:

 Air Belgium (1979–2000)
 Air Belgium (since 2016)